Leticia González Herrero (born in Madrid) is a theoretical chemist, known for her work on molecular excited states, especially ultrafast dynamics of DNA nucleobases and highly accurate simulations of transition metal complexes.

Biography
Leticia González was born in Madrid, Spain and studied chemistry from 1989 to 1994 at the Autonomous University of Madrid. In 1995, she earned her master's degree from King's College London. She returned to Autonomous University of Madrid for her PhD, which she earned in 1998. She then moved to the Free University of Berlin and completed her Habilitation in 2004.
In 2007, she was appointed Professor for Theoretical and Physical Chemistry at the University of Jena. In 2011, she became Full Professor for Computational Chemistry, Theoretical Chemistry and 
Scientific Computing at the University of Vienna.

Honours and awards
 2018: Doctor Honoris Causa of the University of Lorraine 
 2014: Löwdin lecturer
 2011: Dirac Medal of the WATOC (World Association of Theoretical Chemists)
 2006: Heisenberg Stipendium, Deutsche Forschungsgemeinschaft (DFG)
 2005: Guest Professorship Award, Berliner Frauenförderung 
 2005: SIGMA-ALDRICH Award for best Young Researchers, Spanish Royal Society of Chemistry, Spain  
 1999: Alexander von Humboldt Fellowship 
 1999: Premio Extraordinario de Doctorado 1998/1999 (Best PhD Thesis year 1998/1999), Faculty of Sciences, Universidad Autónoma de Madrid

References

External links 
 Homepage of Leticia González' group at the University of Vienna

1971 births
Living people
Alumni of King's College London
Theoretical chemists
Computational chemists
Members of the International Academy of Quantum Molecular Science
Spanish women scientists